Anton Mordasov is a Russian pianist, born in Novosibirsk in 1972.

A student at the Novosibirsk Music College under renowned Professor, Academician, Honored Artist of Russia Mary Lebenzon, in 1990 he won the Rachmaninov Competition and shared the IX Tchaikovsky Competition's 3rd prize with Kevin Kenner and Johan Schmidt. He subsequently settled in the USA, where he won the 1996 Cincinnati Competition. Mordasov teaches at the preparatory department at Texas Christian University. Anton also maintains a private studio at Travis Academy of Fine Arts in Fort Worth. He also teaches at Music Institute of North Texas.

References

Russian classical pianists
Male classical pianists
Texas Christian University faculty
1972 births
Living people
Musicians from Novosibirsk
21st-century classical pianists
21st-century Russian male musicians